Trivisonno is a surname. Notable people with the surname include:

Marcelo Trivisonno (born 1966), Argentine footballer
Mike Trivisonno (born 1949), American radio broadcaster